Jordan Simpson (born 28 August 1985) is an Australian footballer who plays as a central midfielder for National Premier Leagues NSW 2 club Fraser Park FC.

Club career
Simpson played for the Queensland Roar in the inaugural year of the A-League competition but was released in January 2006. In 2006-07 he played for BSC Young Boys of Bern, Switzerland and in 2007 for Perth Glory. Simpson who was signed in August by FF Jaro from Blacktown City Demons, left on 20 February 2009 Finland and turned back to Australia, who has signed with Sydney Olympic FC. He turned in January 2010 from Sydney Olympic back to Blacktown City Demons and now in 2011 he signed with Super League team Northern Spirit FC.

Personal life
Jordan is the twin brother of the late Tyler Simpson.

References

External links
OzFootball profile

1985 births
Living people
People educated at Epping Boys High School
Soccer players from Sydney
A-League Men players
Australian expatriate soccer players
Veikkausliiga players
Blacktown City FC players
BSC Young Boys players
Perth Glory FC players
Brisbane Roar FC players
Sydney Olympic FC players
Bonnyrigg White Eagles FC players
FF Jaro players
Australian twins
Twin sportspeople
Association football midfielders
National Premier Leagues players
Expatriate footballers in Finland
Australian soccer players